The 2019–20 Southeastern Louisiana Lions basketball team represented Southeastern Louisiana University during the 2019–20 NCAA Division I men's basketball season. The Lions were led by first-year head coach David Kiefer, and played their home games at the University Center in Hammond, Louisiana as members of the Southland Conference. They finished the season 8–23, 5–15 in Southland play to finish in a tie for 11th place. They failed to qualify for the Southland Conference tournament.

Previous season
They finished the season 17–16 overall, 12–6 in Southland play to finish in a three-way tie for third place. As the No. 3 seed in the Southland tournament, they advanced to the semifinals, where they lost to Abilene Christian. Head coach Jay Ladner left at the conclusion of the season to become head coach at Southern Miss. Former Lion assistant David Kiefer was hired as his replacement.

Roster

Schedule and results

|-
!colspan=9 style=| Exhibition

|-
!colspan=9 style=| Regular season

Source:

See also 
2019–20 Southeastern Louisiana Lady Lions basketball team

References

Southeastern Louisiana
Southeastern Louisiana Lions basketball seasons
Southeastern Louisiana Lions basketball
Southeastern Louisiana Lions basketball